Thangthong Dewachen Nunnery is a Buddhist monastery in the small Himalayan country of Bhutan. The nunnery is located in Zilukha (Thimphu District) overlooking Tashichodzong and is a few minutes’ drive from the town. It is popularly known as the Zilukha Anim Dratshang.  It was built in 1976 by the 16th emanation of Thangtong Gyalpo, Drubthob Rikey Jadrel. Currently, the nunnery is home to about 60 nuns.

Note: The spelling of "Thangthong" might alternatively appear as "Thangtong" in different articles and websites.

Humanitarian Photographer Bryan Watt created a fine art photography book titled "The Anim of the Thangthong Dewachen Nunnery" in 2019.

References

Buddhist monasteries in Bhutan
Tibetan Buddhist monasteries
Tibetan Buddhism in Bhutan